William Massie (1718-1751) was a colonial Virginia planter and politician who served in the Virginia House of Burgesses.

Biography

William Massie was born May 28, 1718 to Thomas Massie and Mary Massie (née Walker). His father, Thomas, had previously served as a member of the House of Burgesses from 1723 until 1729.

References

1718 births
1751 deaths